Iyo ang Batas, Akin ang Katarungan is a 1988 Filipino action film directed by Leonardo L. Garcia and starring Ramon 'Bong' Revilla Jr., Eddie Garcia, Paquito Diaz, Melissa Mendez, and Romy Diaz. Produced by Buena Films International, it was released on September 22, 1988. Critic Lav Diaz gave the film a negative review, criticizing it as excessively cliché ("gasgas").

Cast

Ramon 'Bong' Revilla Jr. as Dante Reyes
Eddie Garcia as Mayor Oliva
Paquito Diaz as Waldo
Melissa Mendez as Cristy
Romy Diaz as Martin
Nick Romano as Ka Meding
Anita Linda as Pinang
Kring-Kring Gonzalez as Rowena
Nello Nayo as Tomas
Baldo Marro as Chief Rubio
Renato del Prado as Selmo
King Gutierrez as Waldo's bodyguard
Rey Sagum as Waldo's bodyguard
Allan Rogelio as Nestor
Christopher Paloma as Ato
Tony Tacorda
Charlie Davao as Carlos
Bing Davao as Atty. Tablante
Greggo Gavino
Efren Lapid as Cosme
Usman Hassim as Waldo's bodyguard
Robert Miller as Waldo's bodyguard
Vic Varrion as Mayor Oliva's bodyguard
Nonoy de Guzman as Mayor Oliva's bodyguard
Robert Talby
Danny Riel

Release
Iyo ang Batas was graded "B" by the Movie and Television Review and Classification Board (MTRCB), indicating a "Good" quality. It was released in theaters on September 22, 1988.

Critical response
Lav Diaz, writing for the Manila Standard, gave Iyo ang Batas a negative review, criticizing the film overall as excessively cliché ("gasgas") and citing its title, story, action, and dialogue as examples. Diaz stated that "you would feel like you have already seen this movie many times or even heard it in a number of bloody radio programs." However, he noted that what can be considered the film's strength is its intense action, in the vein of films starring Arnold Schwarzenegger and Sylvester Stallone.

In 2016, in the early months of the Philippine Drug War, Janus Isaac Nolasco of Kyoto Review of Southeast Asia cited the film as a demonstration of a general perception that Philippine society lacks an effective criminal justice system, with the hero Dante Reyes deciding to take matters into his own hands against a corrupt mayor.

References

External links

1988 films
1988 action films
Filipino-language films
Films about corruption
Films about miscarriage of justice
Philippine films about revenge
Philippine action films